Machilis is a genus of jumping bristletails in the family Machilidae.

Species
Species within this genus include: 

 Machilis aciliata
 Machilis acuminithorax
 Machilis africanus
 Machilis albifrons
 Machilis aleamaculata
 Machilis alpicola
 Machilis alpina
 Machilis alternata
 Machilis annulicornis
 Machilis appendiculata
 Machilis arctica
 Machilis aurantiacus
 Machilis australis
 Machilis avreus
 Machilis blascoi
 Machilis bokori
 Machilis bouvieri
 Machilis brevicornis
 Machilis burgundiae
 Machilis caestifera
 Machilis capusei
 Machilis chisonensis
 Machilis conjuncta
 Machilis conospini
 Machilis contricta
 Machilis corsica
 Machilis cottianus
 Machilis denisae
 Machilis distincta
 Machilis dolichopsis
 Machilis dragani
 Machilis dudichi
 Machilis dumitrescui
 Machilis engiadina
 Machilis eremita
 Machilis feminoides
 Machilis fernandesi
 Machilis finitima
 Machilis friderici
 Machilis fuscistylis
 Machilis gardinii
 Machilis germanica
 Machilis glacialis
 Machilis grandipalpus
 Machilis grassii
 Machilis gravis
 Machilis guadarramae
 Machilis handschini
 Machilis haroi
 Machilis hauseri
 Machilis helleri
 Machilis helvetica
 Machilis heteropus
 Machilis hrabei
 Machilis huetheri
 Machilis inermis
 Machilis ingens
 Machilis intermedia
 Machilis italicus
 Machilis jurassica
 Machilis kleinenbergi
 Machilis ladensis
 Machilis lehnhoferi
 Machilis lepontica
 Machilis lindbergi
 Machilis longipalpus
 Machilis longiseta
 Machilis lusitana
 Machilis macedonica
 Machilis maculata
 Machilis maritima
 Machilis massanei
 Machilis meijerei
 Machilis melanarthra
 Machilis mesolcinensis
 Machilis montana
 Machilis monticola
 Machilis multispinosa
 Machilis mutica
 Machilis nigrifrons
 Machilis nipponica
 Machilis nivicomes
 Machilis noctis
 Machilis noveli
 Machilis oblitterata
 Machilis obscura
 Machilis orbitalis
 Machilis orientalis
 Machilis oudemansi
 Machilis pampeana
 Machilis pasubiensis
 Machilis pedemontanus
 Machilis peralensis
 Machilis perkinsi
 Machilis perrieri
 Machilis platensis
 Machilis pluriannulata
 Machilis pluriconica
 Machilis plurimacidata
 Machilis poenina
 Machilis praestans
 Machilis provincialis
 Machilis pulchra
 Machilis pyknopalpa
 Machilis pyrenaica
 Machilis rhaetica
 Machilis rhenana
 Machilis robusta
 Machilis rubrofusca
 Machilis rupestris
 Machilis sacra
 Machilis saltatrix
 Machilis sardous
 Machilis scoparia
 Machilis shiobarensis
 Machilis sicula
 Machilis silvestris
 Machilis simplex
 Machilis socarroi
 Machilis spinosissima
 Machilis stachi
 Machilis steinbocki
 Machilis stolli
 Machilis strebeli
 Machilis strenua
 Machilis striata
 Machilis sturmi
 Machilis styriaca
 Machilis succinii
 Machilis sutteri
 Machilis targinii
 Machilis tenuis
 Machilis ticinensis
 Machilis tirolensis
 Machilis torquata
 Machilis vagans
 Machilis vallicola
 Machilis variabilis
 Machilis vicina
 Machilis winchkleri
 Machilis zangherii

References

insect genera